The Magnificent Cuckold or Il magnifico cornuto is a 1964 Italian sex comedy film directed by Antonio Pietrangeli and based on the Belgian play Le Cocu magnifique written by Fernand Crommelynck.

Plot
The Magnificent Cuckold is about a hat tycoon who is ecstatically, if not hungrily, in love with his youthful wife. It is all blissful, that is, until our man, middle-aged and somewhat of a square among his blasé, upper-class friends to whom cuckoldry is a common practice, is seduced by one of them. At this point doubts and suspicions, like conscience, begin to plague him. If he could succumb to extramarital confections, why not his gorgeous mate? Quickly his love for his spouse degenerates beyond obsessive, into the realm of maniacal. He becomes madly concerned that his wife is cheating on him—even though she is not being unfaithful. When he looks at her it becomes obvious to him that she is a very attractive woman. And, all the men around her must be dying to be with her. Gnawed by jealously, he will imagine variations on catching her and her lover red-handed. The film ends with the tycoon realizing his mistake.

Cast
Claudia Cardinale	... 	Maria Grazia
Ugo Tognazzi	... 	Andrea Artusi
Bernard Blier	... 	Mariotti
Michèle Girardon	... 	Cristiana
Paul Guers	... 	Gabriele
Philippe Nicaud
Gian Maria Volonté	... 	Assessore
Susy Andersen	... 	Wanda Mariotti
José Luis de Vilallonga	... 	Presidente
Ester Carloni
Edda Ferronao
Olindo De Turres
Elvira Tonelli
Antonio Gerini
Liliana Salvioni

Reception
The New York Times published a positive, detailed review and stated Il magnifico cornuto was "mildy amusing".

See also
Cuckold (film)

References

External links
 

1965 films
1960s Italian-language films
Commedia all'italiana
Films directed by Antonio Pietrangeli
Adultery in films
Italian films based on plays
Films with screenplays by Ruggero Maccari
1960s Italian films